{{DISPLAYTITLE:C7H12O5}}
The molecular formula C7H12O5 (molar mass: 176.17 g/mol, exact mass: 176.0685 u) may refer to:

 Cyclophellitol
 Glyceryl diacetate
 Isopropylmalic acid
 Valienol

Molecular formulas